Provincial Highway 12, named as Taiwan Boulevard (台灣大道) for its entire length, is a 23.2 km east–west highway that connects Port of Taichung in Wuqi with downtown Taichung City. 

Highway 12 is one of the major thoroughfares of Taichung, connecting the historic downtown at Central District with its newer central business district in Xitun District. The road is also one of three that connect to National freeway 1 in Xitun. Between 2014 and 2015, the Taichung BRT ran on Highway 12 between Taichung railway station and Providence University in Shalu District, and there are plans to build a metro line at the BRT system's former course.

Route description 
Highway 12 begins with additional separated motorcycle lanes on each side at the intersection with Highway 17 in Wuqi District, near the gate of the Port of Taichung. The route runs southeast, crossing Highway 61 and Highway 1, before being elevated over the Western Trunk railway line via the Shalu Overpass (沙鹿陸橋). At downtown Shalu District, the route turns south and begins climbing the Dadu Plateau. At Providence University, the two lanes directly adjacent to the motorcycle lane divider become bus lanes, which were formerly dedicated to the Taichung BRT, but now permit conventional buses to run on. Near the peak, the road turns southeast and briefly enters Longjing District as it intersects Zhongxing Road, which connects to County Route 136 for access to National Freeway 3. 

The road enters Xitun District as it descends into downtown Taichung. At the bottom, the road crosses the Fazi River, then connects to National Freeway 1 and Highway 74 before the middle lanes are elevated over County Route 127 on an overpass known as Guangming Overpass (光明陸橋). After crossing Highway 1B in West District, Taichung, the road's motorcycle lanes and bus lanes end. The road continues through Central District before ending at the north side of Taichung railway station.

Major intersections 
The entire route is in Taichung City.

References

Highways in Taiwan